Kosmos 305 ( meaning Cosmos 305) (Ye-8-5 series) was the fifth Soviet attempt at an unmanned lunar sample return. It was probably similar in design to the Luna 16 spacecraft. It was launched, on a Proton rocket, on October 22, 1969. The engines on the Block D upper stage failed, terminating the mission. This left the spacecraft stranded in Earth orbit. It re-entered within one orbit.

References

External links 

Luna programme
Kosmos satellites
Sample return missions
Missions to the Moon
Spacecraft launched in 1969